The valve trombone is a brass instrument in the trombone family that has a set of valves to vary the pitch instead of (or in addition to) a slide. Although it has been built in sizes from alto to contrabass, it is the tenor valve trombone pitched in B which has seen the most widespread use.
The most common valve trombone has three piston valves, and plays just like a trumpet but an octave lower. They are built in either short or long form.

History 
The valve trombone enjoyed its greatest popularity in the 19th century when the technology of rotary and piston brass instrument valves was developing rapidly. They became popular in European orchestras particularly in Italy and Austria, where composers wrote with a section of three valve trombones in mind.
The valve trombone was also popular in bands in the mid to late 19th century, particularly in America. In New Orleans the slide trombone did not appear until the "tailgate" style of playing around 1904.

Valve trombones were made in many configurations for marching bands, and in particular for mounted bands. A type of cavalry trombone invented by Adolphe Sax in the 1860s has six valves, instead of the usual three, one for each position on the trombone slide. Instead of adding tubing, these valves isolate different amounts of tubing from the total length. Their unusual shape was designed to make it easier for players in cavalry bands to hold and use while mounted.

Alto valve trombones in E♭ were occasionally built but remain rare instruments; a few survive in museums.

This instrument was the prototype for the modern cimbasso, which has seen a 21st century revival in video game music and film scores.

By the beginning of the 20th century, mass production of reliable instruments with high quality slides led to a return to popularity of the slide trombone. Despite this, valve trombones still remain popular in parts of eastern Europe and Italy, in military bands and brass bands in South America and India, and in jazz, often as a doubling instrument for trumpet players.

Performance characteristics 

Some passages, particularly fast musical figures, are easier to execute on a valve trombone than on a slide trombone. Italian composers in particular, such as Verdi and Rossini, made use of its agility. The valve trombone is also useful for situations when the movement of a slide can be impractical, such as when marching, mounted, or playing in a cramped orchestra pit.
Many players consider the tone of a valve trombone to be stuffier and less open, and it is no longer common in orchestras. 

As the B tenor valve trombone uses the same fingering as the B trumpet, it is occasionally a doubling instrument for jazz trumpeters. Notable jazz musicians who play the B tenor valve trombone include Maynard Ferguson, Bob Brookmeyer, Clifford Thornton, Juan Tizol of the Duke Ellington Orchestra, Rob McConnell and Bob Enevoldsen.

Hybrid slide-valve trombones 

Trombones that combine both a slide with a set of valves were built as early as the 1860s by Besson. One of the earliest surviving examples was built by C.G. Conn in 1884, and closely resembles the modern "superbones" developed since the 1970s. A "valide" (a portmanteau of "valve" and "slide") was invented in the 1940s by jazz musician and machinist Brad Gowans, with three piston valves and a short four-position slide. The only known instrument now resides at the Institute of Jazz Studies at Rutgers University.

Superbone 

In the 1970s Maynard Ferguson and Larry Ramirez of Holton Musical Instruments developed the Holton TR-395 "Superbone" for Ferguson to use in his band. Holton patented and manufactured it between 1974 and 2004. Later versions were developed in the early 21st century: James Morrison developed a superbone with Austrian instrument manufacturer Schagerl, which uses a larger  bore and three rotary valves, and Wessex Tubas manufacture a larger bore superbone similar to the Holton.

References

Trombones
Jazz instruments
Marching band instruments